The Bolivian slaty antshrike (Thamnophilus sticturus) is a species of bird in the family Thamnophilidae. It is found in Bolivia (departments of Beni, Cochabamba and Santa Cruz), extreme southwest Brazil (the states of Mato Grosso and Mato Grosso do Sul), and far northern Paraguay (Alto Paraguay department). It was previously included in the widespread slaty antshrike (T. punctatus), but following the split, this scientific name is now restricted to the northern slaty antshrike.

It occurs at low levels in forest and woodland; especially in places with dense growth.

The Bolivian slaty antshrike was described by the Austrian ornithologist August von Pelzeln in 1868 and given its current binomial name Thamnophilus sticturus.

References

Thamnophilus
Birds of Bolivia
Birds described in 1869
Taxonomy articles created by Polbot